Pengiran Anaqi Sufi bin Pengiran Haji Omar Baki (born 22 July 1990) is a Bruneian footballer who plays as a midfielder. He has also played for the Brunei national football team on two occasions.

Club career
A free kick specialist by trade, Anaqi Sufi began his footballing career with AM Gunners of the Brunei Premier League, the club that was headed by Prince Abdul Mateen. He scored the winner against Indera SC to send the Gunners to the semi-finals of the 2010 FA Cup, only to be beaten by MS ABDB through a late winner by Safari Wahit.

Anaqi Sufi moved to Wijaya FC in 2012, and played there until 2020.

On 9 January 2018, Anaqi Sufi scored four goals in the DST FA Cup second round fixture against BSRC FT, the fourth being a direct free-kick.

International career

Anaqi Sufi was a squad member of the Brunei under-21 team that lifted the Hassanal Bolkiah Trophy in 2012.

Anaqi Sufi was called up to the full Brunei squad in March 2015 for the 2018 World Cup qualifiers against Chinese Taipei. He made his international debut as a substitute in the second leg held in Bandar Seri Begawan where Brunei squandered their first leg away victory with a 0-2 defeat which eliminated them from the 2018 FIFA World Cup. He made another appearance for the Wasps at a friendly against Singapore the following June.

Personal life
Besides football, Anaqi Sufi has also represented Brunei in international futsal in 2012. His father, Pengiran Omar Baki Pengiran Japar, is a national chess exponent with a FIDE rating of 1780.

Honours
 
  Meritorius Service Medal (PJK) (2012)

References

External links

1990 births
Living people
Association football midfielders
Bruneian footballers
Brunei international footballers
Wijaya FC players